The Little Lulu Show is an animated series based on Marjorie Henderson Buell's comic book character Little Lulu. The series first aired in 1995 after the cartoonist's death in 1993.

The series was produced by the CINAR Corporation, in association with Western Publishing Company, Inc./Golden Books Family Entertainment, alongside HBO, Beta Film and the CTV Television Network Ltd. for the first two seasons, with the participation of The Cable Production Fund (Season 2) and the Family Channel (Season 3). For the third season, TMO-Loonland Film co-produced the series with CINAR.

Plot

Quick-witted Lulu can outsmart boys, bullies and even grownups! Whether she’s catching frogs for a local restaurant, searching for hidden treasure or tracking down a thief, Little Lulu’s always got an ace up her sleeve. Together with her best friend Tubby, pint-sized Alvin, buck-toothed Annie, smooth Willie and the rest of the neighborhood gang, Lulu always finds herself in the middle of an adventure.

The series focuses on the life and the adventures of Lulu Moppet (voiced by Tracey Ullman and later Jane Woods) and Tubby Tompkins. Between stories called LuluToon, they featured stand-up comedy that Lulu hosted and a series of the musical shorts called Lulu-Bite is also shown. Each episode contains 3 sketches with the different stories, interspersed with a "stand up-comedy" presented by Lulu and 2 short 30-second introductions without speech, based on the last comic stories (with only 3 scenes).

Each storyline featured in the LuluToons are used from comic book releases (including John Stanley ones), with minor alterations.

The series is different from Little Lulu and Her Little Friends, a Japanese anime featuring the same characters made in 1976 and aired internationally in 1978.

Broadcast
The series was aired on HBO Family in the United States and CTV in Canada. The series continued to air on Family Channel, Teletoon Retro (English and French), VRAK.TV, and TeleNiños (Spanish dub only). In foreign countries, the series is also aired on the Australian ABC (part of ABC for Kids), Rai 2, E-Junior, Cartoon Network and Rede Globo.

Characters

Episodes

Voice cast

References

External links

HBO original programming
Australian Broadcasting Corporation original programming
Family Channel (Canadian TV network) original programming
1990s American animated television series
1990s American animated comedy television series
1990s American children's comedy television series
1995 American television series debuts
1999 American television series endings
1990s Canadian animated television series
1990s Canadian children's television series
1990s Canadian comedy television series
1995 Canadian television series debuts
1999 Canadian television series endings
1990s German animated television series
1995 German television series debuts
1999 German television series endings
American children's animated comedy television series
Canadian children's animated comedy television series
German children's animated comedy television series
Television shows based on comic strips
Animated television series about children
Television series set in the 1950s
Television series by Cookie Jar Entertainment
Television series by DHX Media
Television series by Universal Television
English-language television shows
Little Lulu